Douluo Continent is a 2021 Chinese television series based on a fantasy novel of the same name by Tang Jia San Shao, starring Xiao Zhan and Wu Xuanyi. It premiered on Tencent Video, CCTV and WeTV on February 5.

Cast

Main
Xiao Zhan as Tang San
Han Hao Lin as Tang San (young)
A former young prodigy of the renowned Tang Sect. Wielder of dual martial souls, Sky Hammer and Lan Yin Grass.
Wu Xuanyi as Xiao Wu  (voiced by Qiao Shi Yu)
An orphan girl whose martial soul is a rabbit.

Supporting
Seven Devils of Shi Lan Ke
Gao Tai Yu as Dai Mu Bai (voiced by Wei Chao)
Liu Mei Tong as Zhu Zhu Qing (voiced by Li Shi Meng)
Liu Run Nan as Ou Si Ke
Ding Xiao Ying as Ning Rong Rong (voiced by Liu Qing)
Ao Zi Yi as Ma Hong Jun (voiced by Su Shang Qing)
Shrek Academy
Calvin Chen as Yu Xiaogang / Grandmaster (voiced by Wang Kai)
Qiu Xin Zhi as Fei Lande, founder and director of Shrek Academy (Shi Lan Ke)
Zhang Wen as Liu Erlong (voiced by Ma Hai Yan)

Others
Zhong Zhen Tao as Tang Hao (voiced by Xuan Xiao Ming), Tang San's father.
Zhu Zhu as Bi Bidong
Huang Can Can as Hu Liena / Qian Ren Xue (voiced by Lu Xi Ran)
Bao Xiao Song as Prince Xue Xing
Shen Xiao Hai as Ning Feng Zhi
Wen Sheng Hao as Ju Dou Luo
Wang Yi Fan as Ye Zhiqiu
Liu Jiao Xin as Dugu Bo
Ren Qing Na Mu as Dugu Ya
Li De Xin as Yu Tianheng
Miao Hao Jun as Village Leader Ye Huo (voiced by Zhang Yao Han)
Yu An as Tai Long
Bao Bo Yu as Xue Qinghe
Du Jun Ze as Dai Weishi
Guo Jia Nuo as Shi Nian / Jian Dou Luo
Li Hao as Wang Sheng
Ma Dong Chen as Xiao Chenyu 
Ma Rui Ze as Liu Long
Liu Wei as Village Leader of Sheng Hun Village
Cui Peng as Su Yuntao (voiced by Chen Guang)
Song Qing as Bu Le
Wang Gen as Xue Beng
Liu Ya Peng as Ma Hongjun's father

Production
The series production for Douluo Continent was first announced in 2017. On November 1, 2018, preparations for filming were ready and by the end of 2018, preparations for filming had begun.  Filming began in January 2019 until July of the same year.

Xiao Zhan and Wu Xuanyi were first announced as the main characters of this series on December 28, 2019, together with the release of the official poster of this series featuring the two main characters.

Awards and nominations

International broadcast

References

External links

2020s Chinese television series debuts
2021 Chinese television series debuts
2021 Chinese television series endings
Chinese fantasy television series
Television shows based on Chinese novels
Chinese novels adapted into television series
Television series by Tencent Penguin Pictures